The Runner is a 2015 American political drama film written and directed by Austin Stark in his feature directorial debut. The film stars Nicolas Cage, Connie Nielsen, Peter Fonda and Sarah Paulson.

The film was released on August 7, 2015, in a limited release and through video on demand by Alchemy.

Premise

In the aftermath of the 2010, Deepwater Horizon oil spill in the Gulf of Mexico, an idealistic politician (Nicolas Cage) is forced to confront his dysfunctional life after his career is destroyed in a sex scandal. The video comes to light after he grants a live interview his team works together to salvage the situation.

Cast
 Nicolas Cage as Colin Pryce
 Connie Nielsen as Deborah Pryce
 Peter Fonda as Rayne Pryce
 Sarah Paulson as Kate Haber
 Wendell Pierce as Frank Legrand
 Bryan Batt as Mark Lavin
 Dana Gourrier as Daria Winston
 Wanetah Walmsley as Layla
 Ciera Payton as Lucy Hall
 David Dino Wells Jr. as Neighborhood Bum (uncredited)

Production
Madeleine Stowe was originally cast to play the female lead but was replaced by Connie Nielsen. On June 18, 2014, Bryan Batt, Peter Fonda, Connie Nielsen, and Wendell Pierce joined the film's cast.

Filming
Principal photography began on June 23, 2014, in New Orleans, Louisiana. and ended on July 27, 2014. On July 28, Cage was spotted filming at the National Mall in downtown Washington, D.C. The film also shot some scenes in Georgetown.

Release
On June 3, 2015, it was announced Alchemy had acquired distribution rights to the film. It  was released in a limited release and through video on demand on August 7, 2015.

Reception
The Runner has received mixed to negative reviews from critics. On review aggregator website Rotten Tomatoes, the film holds a 24% approval rating based on 38 reviews with a weighted average score of 4.68/10. The website's critics consensus reads "In spite of a promising premise and a roundly talented cast, The Runner is a disappointing outing to be viewed by only the staunchest of Nicolas Cage completists." On Metacritic, the film has a normalized score of 39 out of 100, based on 14 reviews, signifying "generally unfavorable reviews".

References

External links
 
 
 
  (rating 2/5)

2015 films
2015 thriller drama films
American thriller drama films
American political thriller films
Films about businesspeople
Films about politicians
Films set in New Orleans
Films shot in New Orleans
Films shot in Washington, D.C.
Films scored by the Newton Brothers
2015 directorial debut films
2015 drama films
2010s English-language films
2010s American films